Tibor von Földváry (5 July 1863 – 27 March 1912) was a Hungarian figure skater, born in Öttevény. He was the European Figure Skating Championships gold medalist in 1895. He was also a judge at the World Championships shortly after his competitive career.

Results

Sources
European results

Navigation

Sportspeople from Győr-Moson-Sopron County
von Foldvary, Tibor
European Figure Skating Championships medalists